The magpie goose (Anseranas semipalmata) is the sole living representative species of the family Anseranatidae. This common waterbird is found in northern Australia and southern New Guinea. As the species is prone to wandering, especially when not breeding, it is sometimes recorded outside its core range. The species was once also widespread in southern Australia but disappeared from there largely due to the drainage of the wetlands where the birds once bred. Due to their importance to Aboriginal people as a seasonal food source, as subjects of recreational hunting, and as a tourist attraction, their expansive and stable presence in northern Australia has been "ensured [by] protective management".

Description
Magpie geese are unmistakable birds with their black and white plumage and yellowish legs. The feet are only partially webbed, and the magpie goose feeds on vegetable matter in the water, as well as on land. Males are larger than females. Unlike true geese, their molt is gradual, so no flightless periods result. Their voice is a loud honking.

Systematics and evolution
This species is placed in the order Anseriformes, having the characteristic bill structure, but is considered to be distinct from the other species in this taxon. The related and extant families, Anhimidae (screamers) and Anatidae (ducks, geese, and swans), contain all the other taxa. The magpie goose is contained in the genus Anseranas and family Anseranatidae, which are monotypic now.

A cladistic study of the morphology of waterfowl found that the magpie goose was an early and distinctive offshoot, diverging after screamers and before all other ducks, geese, and swans.

This family is quite old, a living fossil, having apparently diverged before the Cretaceous–Paleogene extinction event — the relative Vegavis iaai lived some 68-67 million years ago. The fossil record is limited, nonetheless. The enigmatic genus Anatalavis (Hornerstown Late Cretaceous or Early Paleocene of New Jersey, USA - London Clay Early Eocene of Walton-on-the-Naze, England) is sometimes considered to be the earliest known. Other Paleogene birds sometimes considered magpie-geese are the genera Geranopsis from the Hordwell Formation Late Eocene to the Early Oligocene of England and Anserpica from the Late Oligocene of Billy-Créchy (France).

The earliest known member of the group in Australia is Eoanseranas represented by fossils found in the late Oligocene Carl Creek Limestone of Queensland. Additional fossils from North America and Europe suggest that the family was spread across the globe during the late Paleogene period. The Australian distribution of the living species ties in well with the presumed Gondwanan origin of Anseriformes, but Northern Hemisphere fossils are puzzling. Perhaps the magpie geese were one of the dominant groups of Paleogene waterfowl, only to become largely extinct later.

Ecology and status

The magpie goose is found in a variety of open wetland areas such as floodplains and swamps, where they wade and swim. They eat mostly vegetation such as dry grass blades, grass seeds, spike rush bulbs and wild rice.

It is fairly sedentary apart from some movement during the dry season. They are colonial breeders and are gregarious outside of the breeding season when they can form large and noisy flocks of up to a few thousand individuals. Its nest is on the ground (also in trees 5 m or more high), and a typical clutch is 5-14 eggs. Some males mate with two females, all of which raise the young, unlike some other polygamous birds. This may be beneficial when predation of young is high as chicks raised by trios are more likely to survive.

This species is plentiful across its range, although this is significantly reduced in comparison to the range at time of European settlement. The range once extended as far south as the Coorong and the wetlands of the southeast of South Australia and Western Victoria. For Australia as a whole, it is not threatened and has a controlled hunting season when numbers are large. However, most of the southern populations were extirpated in the mid-20th century by overhunting and habitat destruction. The species has been subject to reintroduction projects such as Bool Lagoon between Penola and Naracoorte. Populations in more northern areas have again reached a level where it can be regularly utilized by hunters, although not in the example provided. The magpie goose was listed as near threatened on the 2007 advisory list of threatened vertebrate fauna in Victoria. In the December 2007 Flora and Fauna Guarantee Act list of threatened fauna, it is also listed. As of early 2008, an Action Statement for the recovery and future management of this species had not been prepared.

With the advent of climate change, and more frequent seawater inundations of the current extensive freshwater floodplains, CSIRO scientists argue that magpie geese populations may be at risk.

In Aboriginal languages
The Kunwinjku of western Arnhem Land know this bird as manimunak. It became an important food item with the formation of wetlands about 1500 ya, and is depicted in rock art from this period.  Mimi figures are often shown holding goose-feather fans. In Yolŋu Matha the bird is known as gurrumaṯtji, or around Ramingining as gumang.

See also
 Magpie duck

References

Further reading
 Carboneras, C. (1992) Family Anatidae (Ducks, Geese and Swans), pp. 536–630 in; del Hoyo, J., Elliott, A. & Sargatal, J. eds. Handbook of the Birds of the World, Vol 1, Ostrich to Ducks Lynx Edicions, Barcelona. 
 Madge, Steve & Burn, Hilary (1987): Wildfowl : an identification guide to the ducks, geese and swans of the world. Christopher Helm, London. 
 Pringle, J.D. (1985): The Waterbirds of Australia. National Photographic Index of Australian Wildlife, Australian Museum/Angus and Robertson, Sydney.

External links

 BirdLife Species Factsheet

Anseranatidae
magpie goose
Birds of the Northern Territory
Birds of Queensland
Birds of Indonesia
Birds of New Guinea
magpie goose
magpie goose